Akhund Mahammadali Huseinzadeh — first shia Sheikh ul-Islam of the Caucasus from 1823 to 1852. Maternal great-grandfather of Ali bey Huseynzade.

Early life
Mahammadali Huseinzadeh was born in Salyan, Shirvan Khanate in 1791. He got his primary religious education in Salyan, Ganja, and later in Baghdad and came to Tbilisi in 1802 where he was appointed as akhund of Shah Abbas Mosque. He was appointed as Sheikh ul-Islam of the Tbilisi in 1822 (or in 1823) and served in this post until 1846. His influence was not wider and only accepted around Tbilisi and Ganja. This influence was mainly decreased after appointment of Mir-Fatah-Agha as head of Caucasian Spiritual Assembly in 1828. His main accomplishment was imperial legalization of sharia courts and feudal rights of beys on 6 December 1846 by Nicholas I just days before his resignation. He was succeeded by Fazil Iravani in 1846.

Despite his resignation, he was active in religious scene and helped to fund a Shiite theological school in Tbilisi on 12 December 1847 with help from Fathali Akhundov and Abbasgulu Bakikhanov. He died on 22 April 1852. His nephew, Ahmad Huseinzadeh also became a sheikh-ul-islam.

Family 
He had at least 2 daughters:

 Nisa Huseinzadeh (b. 1835)
 Husniyya Huseinzadeh — married to her own cousin Ahmad Huseinzadeh

References

1760 births
Azerbaijani Shia clerics
Azerbaijani religious leaders
1852 deaths